The University of Manitoba Students' Union (UMSU) is the university-wide representative body for undergraduate students at the University of Manitoba, located in Winnipeg, Manitoba. UMSU was established in 1919, replacing the former University of Manitoba Students' Association founded in 1914.

Its head office is located in UMSU University Centre—a large, Modernist architecture building designed by Canadian architect Isadore (Issie) Coop at UM's Fort Garry Campus that serves as the university's activity hub. 

UMSU is funded by mandatory student organization fees, included in tuition fees; upon paying their fees, students become full members of the Students' Union. For the 2020-2021 school year, the mandatory UMSU fee was CAD$115.32 per term, $58.52 of which goes to UMSU itself. The executive and community representatives of the Union are elected during the UMSU General Election.

Businesses and services 
The UMSU operates 7 student businesses on campus, all at the University Centre. These businesses include: 

 Degree's — a restaurant 
 G.P.A.'s Campus Convenience — a convenience store 
 VW's Social Club — the campus bar 
 IQ’s Cafe & Billiards — a pool hall and coffee shop 
 UMCycle — a full-service bike shop 
 UMSU Service Centre — an information kiosk that provides information on university-related matters such as registrations, exams, and transit routes/maps, as well as UPass information, poster approvals for University Centre, and a lost-and-found service. It also sells bus passes, other Winnipeg Transit products, and event/social tickets. The Service Centre has replaced the much smaller Answers information booth. 

UMSU also operates a number of non-business operations, such as the Gallery of Student Art, which displays art installations created by students; the Grocery Run, which supplies students living in residence with an opportunity to purchase groceries from the local grocery store; and a Food Bank for students. 

It also administers a number of scholarships and bursaries, travel grants, as well as providing funding for the student radio station, CJUM-FM (more popularly known as UMFM), and the student newspaper, The Manitoban.

In 2018, UMSU partnered with Nimbus Learning to provide students with a peer tutoring program.

Governance
UMSU has a 5-person elected executive, which includes a president and four vice presidents. In 2016, the reported salary for an executive was CA$37,700 per executive, including benefits. The President is responsible for the overall operation of UMSU and serves as the official spokesperson. The President also serves on the University Senate and Board of Governors. The four Vice-Presidents are each responsible for a different portfolio:

 Advocacy — the Vice President Advocacy (VPA) promotes student safety and equity in general, as well as campaigning and assisting with individual student advocacy cases.
 Community Engagement — the Vice President Community Engagement (VPCE) coordinates with UMSU's marketing team for all UMSU communications, as well as overseeing the production and promotion of social, academic, and professional programming events. The VPCE is also in charge of producing all UMSU external marketing materials and coordinating external sponsorships.
 Finance and Operations — the Vice President Finance and Operations (VPFO) oversees the finances of UMSU.
 Student Life — the Vice President Student Life (VPSL) is responsible for maintaining the relationship with and overseeing interactions between UMSU and the student clubs and associations recognized by UMSU. The VPSL also directs and implements UMSU awareness campaigns as well as overseeing food bank operations.

UMSU Board of Directors is the highest authority in the organization, and is made up of student representatives from each of the University's faculties, schools, student residences, the Inner-City Campus, and five positions for community representatives. Each faculty, school or residence has at least one representative, with some having up to four, depending on student population. The five community representatives represent the following marginalized communities of the student body: "womyn students," international students, students living with disabilities, "LGBTTQ* students," and Indigenous students.

The executive and community representatives are elected during the UMSU General Election. UMSU is also member of the Canadian Federation of Students and the Manitoba Alliance of Post-Secondary Students (MAPSS).

There are also various committees that deal with UMSU's governing policies and procedures, including specific areas, such as governance, finance, member services, UPass (a subsidized student bus pass), and the health & dental insurance plan. These committees are composed of a combination of UMSU executives, UMSU Board members, and students-at-large.

UMSU Executives are invited to serve on the Board of Governors and the Senate of the University of Manitoba each year. In the event of openings on committees and task forces, student representation fulfilled or delegated by the UMSU Executive. In 2020, UMSU President Jelynn Dela Cruz served on the University of Manitoba COVID-19 Response Steering Committee. In the previous year, Dela Cruz served on the Presidents' Task Force for Equity, Diversity, and Inclusion.

UMSU is funded by mandatory student organization fees, included in tuition fees; upon paying their fees, students become full members of the Students' Union. For the 2020-2021 school year, the mandatory UMSU fee was CA$$115.32 per term, $58.52 of which goes to UMSU itself.

University of Manitoba Students' Union Act 
The University of Manitoba Students' Union Act is the Manitoban law that defines the University of Manitoba Students' Union, making UMSU the only student government in Canada with its own specific law.

The Act commenced in November 1990, and was amended in 2018.

Past presidents

References

External links

 
 University of Manitoba

Students' associations in Canada
Students'_Union, University_of_Manitoba
1919 establishments in Canada